The Adamasta Channel is a narrow passage between the Chi Ma Wan Peninsula of Lantau Island and Cheung Chau island in Hong Kong. It is one of the few passages in Hong Kong waters with a significant hazard, the Adamasta Rock, in the middle; however, the rock is well marked with a fixed light, and port- and starboard-hand buoys on either side.

The channel experiences heavy traffic at all hours, being the principal route for the frequent fast ferry services between Hong Kong and Kowloon, and Macau, and also several outlying island ferry services.

See also

List of channels in Hong Kong

References

Channels of Hong Kong